Eric Prindle (born August 30, 1976) is an American Heavyweight mixed martial artist who last competed in 2018. A professional competitor since 2008 he has fought in Bellator MMA and Pancrase, and was the Bellator Season Five Heavyweight Tournament Winner.

Background
Prindle was born in Erie, Pennsylvania but grew up in Phoenix, Arizona and Honolulu, Hawaii. Having developed a passion for combat sports from a young age, Prindle competed in kickboxing, winning two amateur bouts at the age of 12 against opponents twice his age and much larger than himself. 

At the age of 18, Prindle enlisted into the United States Army as a weapons specialist and competed in amateur boxing, where he found a wealth of success, going on to win various tournaments, become a five-time All-Army Champion, a four-time Armed Forces Champion, and in all compiled over 100 amateur fights during his time of service. He was with special forces and with the 101st Airborne division.  In 2004, Prindle's military career ended.  He suffered injuries as a soldier and believes that with the benefits Martial Arts has to offer, it helps him mentally subside the injuries and mental trauma he acquired serving his country.

After taking some time off to be with his family, Prindle transitioned into mixed martial arts and has trained at Erik Paulsons school in California for STX and CSW as well as training on his own and at Average Joes MMA in AZ.

Mixed martial arts career

Early career
Prindle made his professional debut in 2008 against veteran Jimmy Ambriz and was defeated via submission. However, Prindle would go on to win his next four fights before being invited to compete in Bellator.

Bellator
Eric made his Bellator debut in April 2011 at Bellator 40 where he defeated Josh Burns via TKO (Doctor Stoppage) at the end of round two. The fight took place on the MTV2 live broadcast.

Prindle entered into the Bellator Season Five Heavyweight Tournament.  His first fight was against Abe Wagner on October 1, 2011, at Bellator 52. Prindle won the back-and-forth fight via unanimous decision.

In the semifinal round, Prindle faced Ron Sparks at Bellator 56 and needed to just 40 seconds to KO him in order to advance to the finals.

Prindle faced Thiago Santos in the finals held at Bellator 59. The bout was ruled a No Contest after Santos kicked Prindle in the groin at 1:24 of the first round and Prindle was unable to continue.

Prindle and Santos were scheduled to have a rematch at Bellator 61 on March 16, 2012. However, on March 15, Bellator announced the fight had been pushed back a week to Bellator 62 due to Prindle having "flu-like symptoms." A week later at the Bellator 62 weigh-ins, Santos weighed in 12 pounds overweight for the rescheduled rematch and the bout was called off. Prindle was announced as the Season Five Heavyweight Tournament Winner.

Prindle competed in the Bellator Season Seven Heavyweight Tournament, where he faced Thiago Santos in their long-awaited rematch in the quarter finals at Bellator 75. Prindle would be disqualified after kicking Santos in the groin.

Prindle was expected to fight Brett Rogers at Bellator 93 on March 21, 2013. However, the bout was cancelled when Prindle pulled out.

In Prindle's next bout with Bellator, he faced Australian Peter Graham at Bellator 104. Prindle lost a hard-fought unanimous decision.

Prindle next fought Javy Ayala at Bellator 111 on March 7, 2014. He lost the fight via TKO at 2:05 in the third round.

Prindle's next fight was against PRIDE veteran James Thompson at Bellator 121 on June 6, 2014. Prindle lost via TKO in the first round.

On June 25, 2014, it was announced that Prindle was released from the promotion, along with 18 other fighters.

Post-Bellator
Prindle made his return at Pancrase 269 on August 9, 2015. His opponent was Mitsuyoshi Nakai and he won the fight via TKO in the second round.  Prindle had a rematch with Nakai on November 28, 2015, and won the fight this time via submission in the first round.

Bare knuckle boxing
Prindle faced Sam Shewmaker at a Bare Knuckle FC event held on June 2, 2018. He lost the fight via knockout just 18 seconds into the first round.

Championships and accomplishments
Bellator Fighting Championship
Bellator Season Five Heavyweight Tournament Winner

Mixed martial arts record

|-
|Win
| align=center|12–9 (1)
| Jonathan Tsosie
| TKO (punches)
| MEFC 1: Moore Extreme Fighting Challenge
| 
| align=center|1 
| align=center|2:18
| Payson, Arizona, United States
|
|-
|Loss
| align=center| 11–9 (1)
| Evgeny Erokhin
| TKO (punches)
| Far Eastern Federation of Modern Pankration 204
| 
| align=center| 1
| align=center| 4:31
| Vladivostok, Russia
|
|-
|Loss
| align=center| 11–8 (1)
| Paul Buentello
| KO (punch)
| Abu Dhabi Warriors 4
| 
| align=center| 1
| align=center| 1:04
| Abu Dhabi, United Arab Emirates
| 
|-
|Win
| align=center|11–7 (1)
| Maurice Jackson
| Submission (kimura)
| MCF 11
| 
| align=center|1 
| align=center|2:39
| Nebraska, United States
|
|-
|Win
| align=center|10–7 (1)
| Mitsuyoshi Nakai
| Submission (americana)
| Pancrase 272
| 
| align=center|1 
| align=center|1:59
| Honolulu, Hawaii, United States
|
|-
|Win
| align=center|9–7 (1)
| Mitsuyoshi Nakai
| TKO (punches)
| Pancrase 269
| 
| align=center|2 
| align=center|0:40
| Tokyo, Japan
|
|-
|Loss
| align=center| 8–7 (1)
| Brandon Cash
| TKO (submission to punches)
| The Warriors Cage 22
| 
| align=center| 1
| align=center| 2:18
| Porterville, California, United States
|
|-
|Loss
| align=center| 8–6 (1)
| James Thompson
| TKO (punches)
| Bellator 121
| 
| align=center| 1
| align=center| 1:55
| Thackerville, Oklahoma, United States
| 
|-
|Loss
|align=center| 8–5 (1)
|Javy Ayala
|TKO (punches)
|Bellator 111
|
|align=center|3
|align=center|2:05
|Thackerville, Oklahoma, United States
|
|-
|Loss
|align=center| 8–4 (1)
|Peter Graham
|Decision (unanimous)
|Bellator 104
|
|align=center|3
|align=center|5:00
|Cedar Rapids, Iowa, United States
|
|-
| Win
|align=center| 8–3 (1)
| Vince Lucero
| TKO (punches)
| Imperio MMA
| 
|align=center| 1
|align=center| 0:12
|Tampico, Mexico
|
|-
| Loss
|align=center| 7–3 (1)
| Thiago Santos
| DQ (groin kick)
| Bellator 75
| 
|align=center| 1
|align=center| 4:54
|Hammond, Indiana, United States
|
|-
| Loss
|align=center| 7–2 (1)
| Cole Konrad
| Submission (kimura)
| Bellator 70
| 
|align=center| 1
|align=center| 1:00
|New Orleans, Louisiana, United States
|
|-
| NC
|align=center| 7–1 (1)
| Thiago Santos
| No Contest (groin axe kick)
| Bellator 59
| 
|align=center| 1
|align=center| 1:24
|Atlantic City, New Jersey, United States
|
|-
| Win
|align=center| 7–1
| Ron Sparks
| KO (punch) 
| Bellator 56
| 
|align=center| 1
|align=center| 0:40
|Kansas City, Kansas, United States
|
|-
| Win
|align=center| 6–1
| Abe Wagner
| Decision (unanimous)
| Bellator 52
| 
|align=center| 3
|align=center| 5:00
|Lake Charles, Louisiana, United States
|
|-
| Win
|align=center| 5–1
| Josh Burns
| TKO (doctor stoppage)
| Bellator 40
| 
|align=center| 2
|align=center| 5:00
|Newkirk, Oklahoma, United States
|
|-
| Win
|align=center| 4–1
| Steve Whitey
| TKO (punches)
| Gladiator Challenge: Royal Flush
| 
|align=center| 1
|align=center| 1:30
|San Jacinto, California, United States
| 
|-
| Win
|align=center| 3–1
| Chris Barnett
| Decision (majority)
| Martial Combat 12
| 
|align=center| 3
|align=center| 5:00
|Sentosa, Singapore
| 
|-
| Win
|align=center| 2–1
| Brad Tidwell
| TKO (punches)
| FFI: Blood and Sand 7
| 
|align=center| 3
|align=center| N/A
|Biloxi, Mississippi, United States
| 
|-
| Win
|align=center| 1–1
| Johnathan Tsosie
| TKO (submission to punches)
| Rage in the Cage 112
| 
|align=center| 1
|align=center| 0:24
|Prescott, Arizona, United States
| 
|-
| Loss
|align=center| 0–1
| Jimmy Ambriz
| Submission (north-south choke)
| Rage in the Cage 110
| 
|align=center| 1
|align=center| 1:31
|Phoenix, Arizona, United States
|

Bare knuckle record

|- 
|Loss
|align=center|0-1
|Sam Shewmaker
|KO (punch)
|BKFC 1: The Beginning
|
|align=center|1
|align=center|0:18
|Cheyenne, Wyoming, United States
|
|-

References

External links
 

1976 births
Living people
American male mixed martial artists
Heavyweight mixed martial artists
Mixed martial artists utilizing boxing
United States Army soldiers
Sportspeople from Erie, Pennsylvania
Bare-knuckle boxers